Chicken Bone Beach was a racially segregated section of the Atlantic Ocean beach at Atlantic City, New Jersey (between Missouri and Mississippi Avenues) known for attracting many African Americans. It was given this name by the locals due to the volume of chicken bones presumably found in this segregated area during regular clean ups although by all accounts the reports were simply unfounded.

Background
Blacks and whites lived in the area side by side with few problems after the American Civil War. It wasn't until 1900 that the beach became segregated, due in part to pressures by local businesses. It remained a blacks only beach until the passing of the Civil Rights Act of 1964.

While there were no signs nor laws prohibiting blacks from enjoying the entirety of the beach, the segregation was rigidly enforced by local authorities or more commonly, white beachgoers. The Atlantic City Beach Patrol was officially desegregated, but its black members were in practice consigned to Chicken Bone Beach.

References

External links
 Chicken Bone Beach Historical Foundation at chickenbonebeach.org

African-American history of New Jersey
Atlantic City, New Jersey
Beaches of Atlantic County, New Jersey
Beaches of New Jersey
Civil liberties in the United States
Neighborhoods in Greater Atlantic City, New Jersey